Kwakowo  is a village in the administrative district of Gmina Kobylnica, within Słupsk County, Pomeranian Voivodeship, in northern Poland.

The estate was a property of the von Blumenthal family. For the history of the region, see History of Pomerania.

The village has a population of 576.

People 
 Joachim von Blumenthal (1720-1800), Prussian politician

From Wikipedia, the free encyclopedia

Webpages: 

Kwakowo dawniej i dziś

References

Kwakowo